This is the list of notable stars in the constellation Boötes, sorted by decreasing brightness. The genitive for stars in this constellation is Boötis and the IAU abbreviation is Boo. Hence, η Boo is Eta Boötis.

See also
List of stars by constellation

References

List
Bootes